Sir Robert John Price (26 April 1854 – 18 April 1926) was a British surgeon, barrister and Liberal Party politician. He sat in the House of Commons from 1892 to 1918, and was one of only a few British politicians to have also pursued careers in both medicine and the law.

He was the son of Edward Price of Highgate, North London and his wife Elvina née Mountford. He was educated at Cholmeley School, better known as Highgate School, in Highgate and at University College Hospital, where he graduated M.R.C.S.E. in 1876. He was called to the bar at the Middle Temple in 1883.

Price elected at the 1892 general election as the Member of Parliament (MP) for East Norfolk, and held the seat until he retired from Parliament at the 1918 general election.

He was knighted in 1908.

Price died on 18 April 1926, a week before his 72nd birthday, at Sussex Mansions in London.

Personal life 
In 1881 he married Eva Montgomery, daughter of Jasper Wilson Johns, who had been a Liberal MP for the Nuneaton division of Warwickshire.

References

External links 
 

 
  
 

1854 births
1926 deaths
Liberal Party (UK) MPs for English constituencies
UK MPs 1892–1895
UK MPs 1895–1900
UK MPs 1900–1906
UK MPs 1906–1910
UK MPs 1910
UK MPs 1910–1918
Knights Bachelor
Members of the Middle Temple
People educated at Highgate School
Alumni of University College London
People from Highgate